The Wangchuan ji is a collection of Tang poetry written by the two poets Wang Wei (王維) and Pei Di (裴迪), also known in other ways, such as Wheel River Collection. The verses are based on a series of twenty scenes, inspired by the sights available at Wang Wei's retirement estate: each one forms the topic for a pair of one five-character quatrains, one by each of the poetic pair, first Wang Wei, then Pei Di. Besides the long-term interest in these verses in China, this anthology has created much interest around the world, including numerous translations, especially Wang's version of "Deer Park". Several complete translations of the whole work have been done, in English. A series of "Twenty Scenes" of Wangchuan were done as a painting series. The Wangchuan poems (and related artworks) form an important part of traditional Chinese Shan shui landscape painting and Shanshui poetry development. There are clear indications of the influence of the Six Dynasties poet early exemplar of landscape genre poetry Xie Lingyun's poems on topics, partly inspired by his family estate, in what is today Zhejiang. The considerable influence of Pei Di and Wang Wei's Wangchuan ji shows in much subsequent painting, music, and poetry.

Setting
Some of Wang Wei's most famous poetry was done as a series of quatrains written by him to which his friend Pei Di wrote replying double couplets. Together, these form a group titled the Wang River Collection. Note that "Wang" as in the river is a different character that the "Wang" of Wang Wei's name. Wang literally refers to rim or outside part of a wheel, chuan means "river" and ji means a collection. Sometimes, also, these are sometimes referred to as the "Lantian poems", after the real name of Wang's estate's location, in Lantian County.

Wang Wei's career as a government official had its ups and downs. One of his early positions was serving in Liangzhou, which then was a term used to refer to the larger area of Wuwei. After completing his service there and returning to the capital city of Chang'an, Wang Wei took the opportunity of his temporary lack of official posting to explore the countryside to the south of the capital, in the Lantian area of the Zhongnan Mountains. As well, Wang Wei then made friends with Pei Di. In 740-741 Wang resumed his successful governmental career, including an inspection tour of Xiangyang, Hubei, and then he held  various positions in Chang'an. Besides the official salary connected with this government work, he had received financial rewards as an artist; thus he was able to acquire a sizable estate in Lantian, formerly owned by the poet Song Zhiwen (approximately 660–712), an estate known as Wang Chuan. Upon his Lantian estate Wang Wei established a shrine for sake of his Buddhist mother, and after his mother died, in 747-748, he spent the traditional three-year morning period for the death of a parent in this location, during which time he was reportedly so afflicted by grief as to having been reduced almost to a skeleton.

Inspired, in part, by Wang's Lantian home and features found in its neighborhood and their correspondences with other places and features, the collection includes such pieces as the poem often translated "Deer Park" (literally, "Deer Fence"). However, the poems tend to have a deceptive simplicity to them, while they actually have great depth and complexity upon closer examination. Part of the complexity derives from the ironic juxtaposition of imagination and exaggeration with the realities of a retired official's situation at the time. In these poems, there is a theme of metaphorical comparison between features of Wang's estate and places well known to the poets to the poets and their audience to have famously existed elsewhere in the world as known to them. Wang Wei may have had a fence to keep deer out of his vegetable garden, but an actual deer park (as in Europe at the time) would have been a royal prerogative; however, in the poets' imagination the two become one. The real life location of Wang Wei's retirement home was in the foothills of the Qinling Mountains, south of the Tang capital city of Chang'an, in what is now Lantian County, of Xi'an Sub-provincial city, of Shaanxi. The poems tend to literally describe the posh and palatial features of a fantastic and enormous estate; however these specific details should be viewed within the context of poetic flights of fancy (and a dry humour): as art critic and Chinese scholar John Ferguson put it, in regards to the Wheel River property as describe by the two poets:

Jerome Ch'en and Michael Bullock describe Wang Wei's studio:

Gallery
The Wangchuan landscape described in the Tang dynasty poems had a correspondence in painted imagery. Guo Zhongshu was one such painter, who flourished not long after the fall of the Tang.

Modern influence
The Wheel River poems record the poets' journey, that of Wang Wei and his close friend Pei Di.  They are far more universal than a few simple day trips to admire the scenery and have inspired generations of poets since, including recent adaptations such as Pain Not Bread's  and
Eliot Weinberger and Octavio Paz's 19 Ways of Looking at Wang Wei  is an essay concerning more than 19 translations of Wang Wei's "Deer Park". Furthermore, the imaginary series of views inspired subsequent series of "Twenty Views of Wang Chuan" paintings or panoramas including the twenty views (actually the painting tradition for some reason contains or tends to contain a variant set of the twenty scenes of the poems).

See also
Chinese poetry
Classical Chinese poetry
Dhamek Stupa
Meng Haoran
Sarnath
Tang poetry
Wang Wei (Tang dynasty)
Xie Lingyun

Notes

References
Chang, H. C. (1977). Chinese Literature 2: Nature Poetry. New York: Columbia University Press. 
Ch'en, Jerome and Michael Bullock (1960). Poems of Solitude. London: Abelard-Schuman. 
Ferguson, John C. (1927). Chinese Painting. Chicago: University of Chicago Press.

Tang dynasty poetry
Chinese poetry collections
Chinese classic texts
Poetry anthologies